James Corcoran Donnelly (December 9, 1881 – March 24, 1952) was an American football player and coach in the early 1900s.  He played football at Worcester's Classical High School then went on to Dartmouth where he played football. After graduation in 1905 he went to Harvard Law School and was admitted to the bar in 1908.  He practiced law and served as head football coach at Worcester Polytechnic Institute (1909, 1911, 1915), Howard College in Birmingham, Alabama (1910), and Miami University in Oxford, Ohio (1912–1914), compiling a career college football record of 22–32–4. In 1931, he was appointed a Superior Court judge. His younger brother, Charley Donnelly also coached football at the high school and college level. His youngest brother, Ralph E. Donnelly, was also a standout football player and war hero.

Early life
Donnelly was born on December 9, 1881 in Clinton, Massachusetts.  Donnelly was the oldest of seven children born to John E. Donnelly and Mary Ellen Corcoran Donnelly.  His father immigrated from England and was a machinist in Clinton.  His siblings were: John W. Donnelly, Charles Francis Donnelly, Joseph Alyosius Donnelly, Mary Valentine Donnelly Campbell, Ralph Edward Donnelly, and Kathleen Louise Donnelly Crowley.  James graduated from Classical High School in Worcester, where he had starred in football.

College career
He attended Dartmouth College where he graduated with an A.B. in 1905.  He excelled in football where he played end on the first Dartmouth football team to beat Harvard. In 1904, his final year, he lettered under coach Fred Folsom.  That year, he helped the Dartmouth eleven to an undefeated record of 9–0–1 with a scoreless tie to national power Harvard. Donnelly played alongside three Walter Camp All-Americans, Joseph Gilman at guard (2nd team), Ralph Glaze at end (3rd team) and James Vaughn at halfback (3rd team).  The team out scored its opponents by a combined score of 143 to 13.  After graduating from Dartmouth, Donnelly attended Harvard Law School and graduated in 1907.

Legal career
After graduating from Harvard, he was admitted to the bar in 1908 and became a lawyer in Worcester, Massachusetts.  Early in his career, he clerked in the law office of Thayer & Cobb, where he worked with Webster Thayer, later the judge in the Sacco and Vanzetti Trial. In 1908, he became law partners with Charles F. Campbell.  In 1931, he was appointed as a judge in the Superior Court in Worcester by Governor Joseph B. Ely.  His appointment was aided partly by the political connections of his family and his law partner but was hailed by the legal community because he was known for his consistency and fairness.

Coaching career
In the fall of 1905 he began coaching local high schools and colleges in the area.  During the period from 1905 to 1909 he was the football coach of one or two teams per season including ones at Worcester High School, Worcester Polytechnic Institute, and Highland Military Academy of Worcester.   In 1910 he took the head football job at Howard College (now known as Samford University) in Birmingham, Alabama.  His team finished the season with a 1–8 record only scoring 10 points to their opponents' 304.  In 1911 he returned to coach at Worcester Polytechnic Institute until he was hired for the 1912 football season as an acting professor of physical education and football coach at Miami University in Oxford, Ohio.   In the three years as head coach at Miami he had a combined record  14–8–2.  Donnelly was replaced as head football coach for the 1915 season by Chester J. Roberts.  At the time Miami was changing their philosophy of athletics by moving to an all-year athletic coach.  Donnelly was unable to be in Oxford for the entire school year since he could only take a limited amount of time off from his law practice in Massachusetts.

Personal life
He married Mary O’Reilly of Worcester on October 21, 1920 and they had three children: James, Jr., Rosemary, and Elizabeth Ann.   Judge Donnelly was killed in a traffic accident in Ashland, Virginia on the way back from Florida on March 24, 1952. His car was hit head on by a truck.  His wife and his daughter, Rosemary were also in the car at the time of the accident, with Rosemary also being killed.

Head coaching record

College football

References

External links
 

1881 births
1952 deaths
Dartmouth Big Green football players
Miami RedHawks football coaches
Samford Bulldogs baseball coaches
Samford Bulldogs football coaches
WPI Engineers football coaches
High school football coaches in Massachusetts
Massachusetts lawyers
Harvard Law School alumni
Players of American football from Massachusetts
20th-century American lawyers